Joyce Curtis Mulliken (August 29, 1945 – June 26, 2021) was an American politician who served in the Washington House of Representatives from the 13th district from 1995 to 2003 and in the Washington State Senate from the 13th district from 2003 to 2006.

References

1945 births
2021 deaths
Republican Party members of the Washington House of Representatives
Republican Party Washington (state) state senators
Women state legislators in Washington (state)
People from Rumford, Maine